Mom P.I. is a 1990–92 Canadian television comedy-drama series starring Rosemary Dunsmore, Stuart Margolin, Emily Perkins, and Shane Meier. Dunsmore plays eternal optimist Sally Sullivan, a recently widowed mother of two supporting her family as a waitress in a working-class diner, who talks her way into a job as assistant to grumpy, cynical private eye Bernie Fox (Margolin).

The head writer for the show was Chris Haddock, who later created the much grittier Da Vinci's Inquest and Intelligence, also for the CBC.

References

1990 Canadian television series debuts
1992 Canadian television series endings
CBC Television original programming
Television shows set in Vancouver
Television shows filmed in Vancouver
1990s Canadian comedy-drama television series